Little Miss Sunshine is a musical adapted from the 2006 film of the same name, with music and lyrics by William Finn and book and direction by James Lapine. The musical premiered in San Diego, California at the Mandell Weiss Theater, La Jolla Playhouse on February 15, 2011  and began performances Off-Broadway at the Second Stage Theatre in October 2013. The musical opened Off West End at the Arcola Theatre in 2019.

Production history 
The play was workshopped at the Sundance Institute Theatre Lab at White Oak in Yulee, Florida, from October 25 through November 7, 2009. It then premiered at the La Jolla Playhouse from February 15 through March 27, 2011. The score is by William Finn, with musical staging at La Jolla by Christopher Gattelli. A private reading was done at La Jolla in September 2011, featuring Raúl Esparza and Sherie Rene Scott.

The musical premiered Off-Broadway at the Second Stage Theatre on October 15, 2013 (previews), and officially on November 14, 2013. The production was given a one-week extension before the official opening. The show closed on December 15, 2013. The cast features Will Swenson as Richard Hoover, Hannah Rose Nordberg as Olive Hoover, Stephanie J. Block as Sheryl Hoover, Rory O’Malley as Frank Hoover, Wesley Taylor as Joshua Rose, Josh Lamon as Buddy, David Rasche as Grandpa Hoover, Jennifer Sanchez as Miss California and Logan Rowland as Dwayne Hoover. The musical has "undergone a major overhaul since its world premiere at California's La Jolla Playhouse in February 2011, retaining only three songs from the original version." The musical is directed by Lapine, with scenic design by Beowulf Boritt, costume design by Jennifer Caprio, lighting design by Ken Billington, sound design by Jon Weston, and choreography by Michele Lynch.

The musical opened at the Arcola Theatre, Off West End, before touring the UK and Ireland in a new production directed by Mehmet Ergen and produced by Selladoor Productions, marking the show's European premiere.

La Jolla cast
Georgi James played the role of Olive Hoover in the premiere production at the La Jolla Playhouse. Other cast included Hunter Foster, Malcolm Gets, Dick Latessa, Jennifer Laura Thompson, and Taylor Trensch.

On March 11, 2011 Malcolm Gets left the show. Ensemble member Andrew Samonsky took over the role of Uncle Frank, and understudy Ryan Wagner took over the role of Joshua Rose until the show closed on March 27, 2011.

Principal roles and casts

Awards and nominations

Original Off-Broadway production

References

External links
Off-Broadway Database listing

2011 musicals
Musicals based on films
Musicals by James Lapine
Musicals by William Finn